The Gullah are African Americans who live in the Lowcountry region of the U.S. states of Georgia, Florida, and South Carolina.

Gullah may also refer to:
 Gullah language
 Gullah/Geechee Cultural Heritage Corridor or Gullah Territory
 Gullah Jack (died 1822), African slave in Charleston, South Carolina, who took part in a slave revolt

See also

 Gulla, surname
 Geechee (disambiguation)
 Geechie, a nickname for Gullah persons